Rollingergrund-North Belair is a quarter in north-western Luxembourg City, in southern Luxembourg.  Within the modern quarter lies most of the former commune of Rollingergrund.

, the quarter has a population of 4,571 inhabitants.

References

Quarters of Luxembourg City